Shawn Renwick (born 31 August 1979) is a rugby union player. He previously played with the Scottish provincial side Glasgow Warriors; and with the South African provincial side Western Province.

Rugby Union career

Amateur career

He played for Moseley.

He played for Esher in 2002.

He played for Stirling County.

He signed for Esher at the start of the 2008-09 season. He was still with Esher in 2009.

In 2013, he was playing for Sutton & Epsom.

Provincial and professional career

He played for Western Province in South Africa.

He played for Glasgow Warriors in their Celtic League match against the Dragons on 5 March 2004. He has the Warrior Number 123.

References

1979 births
Living people
Glasgow Warriors players
Stirling County RFC players
Esher RFC players
Moseley Rugby Football Club players
Sutton & Epsom RFC players
Western Province (rugby union) players